Laujar de Andarax is a municipality of Almería province, in the autonomous community of Andalusia, Spain.

History
The people of Laujar de Andarax took part in the rebellion of the Alpujarras in 1500, triggered by the forced conversion of its Muslim population to Christianity. It was the scene of one of the most violent episodes during the suppression of the rebellion. Two hundred Muslims who had taken refuge in a local mosque were blown up with gunpowder under the order of Louis de Beaumont.

Location and geography 
Its surface area is 92 km2 and it has a density of 20.0 inhabitants / km2. Its geographic coordinates are 36º 59 ', N, 2º 53', O. It is located in the Alpujarra of Almeria at an altitude of 918 meters and 69 kilometers from the provincial capital, Almería.

Demographics
With a more than 1500 inhabitants, the town has the largest population of that region.

Notable people 

 : jurist, geographer and missionary to the Philippines; was born in Laujar in 1696.
 Francisco Villaespesa Martín: modernist poet born in Laujar in 1877.
 : historian born in Laujar in 1905.

References 

Municipalities in the Province of Almería